This is a listing of the conifers of Canada, and includes the cypresses, junipers, firs, pines, spruces, larches, hemlocks and yews.

Cupressaceae (cypresses) 

|}

Pinaceae (pines) 

|}

Taxaceae (yews) 

|}

C

Conifers